Tor Mann (25 February 1894 – 29 March 1974) was a Swedish conductor.

Mann was principal conductor of the Göteborgs Symfoniker from 1925 to 1939, and the Sveriges Radios Symfoniorkester from 1939 to 1959.

References

1894 births
1974 deaths
Swedish conductors (music)
Male conductors (music)
20th-century conductors (music)
20th-century Swedish male musicians